Nakamura may refer to:

Places
Nakamura, Kōchi, a former city in Kōchi Prefecture, Japan
Nakamura-ku, Nagoya, a ward in Nagoya city in Aichi Prefecture, Japan

People
Nakamura (surname), a list of people with the surname

Other uses
Nakamura stable, a stable of sumo wrestlers
Nakamura Station, a railway station in Shimanto, Kōchi Prefecture, Japan

See also
Namakura language, an Oceanic language of Vanuatu